The 1978 World Figure Skating Championships were held in Ottawa, Ontario, Canada from March 1 to 6. At the event, sanctioned by the International Skating Union, medals were awarded in men's singles, ladies' singles, pair skating, and ice dancing.

The ISU Representative was Jacques Favart of France. The ISU Technical Delegates were Josef Dědič of Czechoslovakia and Charles DeMore of the United States. Vern Taylor of Canada became the first person to land a triple axel (albeit over rotated), in competition.

Medal tables

Medalists

Medals by country

Results

Men

Referee:
 Sonia Bianchetti 

Assistant Referee:
 Benjamin T. Wright 

Judges:
 Gerhard Frey 
 Oskar Urban 
 Ludwig Gassner 
 Ramona McIntyre 
 Pamela Peat 
 Walburga Grimm 
 Kinuko Ueno 
 Dorothy MacLeod 
 Monique Georgelin 

Substitute judge:
 Ferenc Kertész

Ladies

Referee:
 Elemér Terták 

Assistant Referee:
 David Dore 

Judges:
 Walter Hüttner 
 Pamela Davis 
 Margaret Berezowski 
 Goro Ishimaru 
 Ingrid Linke 
 Markus Germann 
 Eva von Gamm 
 Giorgio Siniscalco 
 E. Newbold Black IV 

Substitute judge:
 Leena Vainio

Pairs

Referee:
 Oskar Madl 

Assistant Referee:
 Donald H. Gilchrist 

Judges:
 Eva von Gamm 
 Walburga Grimm 
 Goro Ishimaru 
 Leena Vainio 
 Monique Georgelin 
 Norris Bowden 
 Elaine DeMore 
 Oskar Urban 
 Giorgio Siniscalco 

Substitute judge:
 Pamela Davis

Ice dancing

Referee:
 George J. Blundun 

Assistant Referee:
 Emil Skákala 

Judges:
 Lino Clerici 
 Nancy Meiss 
 Gerhard Frey 
 Oskar Urban 
 Roy Haines 
 Ferenc Kertész 
 Lysiane Lauret 
 Roy Mason 
 Ludwig Gassner 

Substitute judge:
 Inkeri Soininen

Sources
 Result list provided by the ISU

World Figure Skating Championships
World Figure Skating Championships
World Figure Skating Championships
World Figure Skating Championships
International figure skating competitions hosted by Canada
1978 in Canadian sports
Sports competitions in Ottawa
1970s in Ottawa
March 1978 sports events in Canada